Jelaing Mersat (born 31 December 1948) was the Member of the Parliament of Malaysia for the Saratok constituency in Sarawak from 2004 until 2013, representing the Sarawak Progressive Democratic Party (SPDP). During his time in Parliament he served as Deputy Home Minister in the Barisan Nasional coalition government, and later as Deputy Minister for Transport.

Jelaing was elected to Parliament in the 2004 election, replacing Peter Tinggom as the SPDP's Barisan Nasional candidate for the Saratok seat.  He had been a staffer to Tinggom while the latter was a Deputy Minister. Jelaing was dropped as the Barisan Nasional's candidate for the 2013 election, in favour of SPDP president William Mawan Ikom. Jelaing and a group of his supporters within the SPDP protested against his replacement and refused to support Mawan's candidacy.

Election results

Honours
 :
 Companion of the Most Exalted Order of the Star of Sarawak (JBS) (2009)

References

Living people
1948 births
People from Sarawak
Members of the Dewan Rakyat
Progressive Democratic Party (Malaysia) politicians